Cardinal is a Swiss brand of beer and a former brewery founded in 1788 by François Piller, located in Fribourg.  The brewery was acquired by Feldschlösschen in 1991, which itself was acquired by the Carlsberg Group in 2000.

The brewery in Fribourg was closed in 2011, and today Cardinal is brewed at the Feldschlösschen brewery in Rheinfelden, Aargau.

The flagship beer of the Cardinal brand is Cardinal Blonde, a pale lager, which is heavily promoted in the country. The state and the city of Fribourg took over the factory site on June 1, 2012, for 21.5 million Swiss francs to build a technology and innovation park there.

References

External links

 Official site (in French and German)

Beer in Switzerland
Swiss brands